Donald or Don Reed may refer to:

 Donald Reed (actor) (1901–1973), Mexican-American film actor, and later, Beverly Hills video consultant
 Don Reed (American football) (1920–2012), head coach for the Long Beach State 49ers football program
 Donald H. Reed Jr. (born 1933), American politician, member of the Florida House of Representatives
 Donald A. Reed (1935–2001), founder of Academy of Science Fiction, Fantasy and Horror Films and its Saturn Awards
 Don Collins Reed, American ethicist and historian of philosophy
 Don Reed (comedian) (born 1959), American actor, writer, producer, director and comedian

See also 
 Donald Reid (disambiguation)